Celebrity Big Brother 2009, also known as Celebrity Big Brother 6, was the sixth series of Celebrity Big Brother. It was broadcast on Channel 4, launching on 2 January 2009 and running for 22 days until 23 January 2009. The launch show was watched by approximately 6.4 million people. Davina McCall returned as main presenter, with George Lamb as host of Big Brother's Little Brother, and Jack Whitehall as host of Big Brother's Big Mouth. The winner of this series was Ulrika Jonsson, with Terry Christian second.

This was the first series of Celebrity Big Brother to air since the racism controversy of 2007, during series 5, although Channel 4's sister channel E4 aired a similar spin-off in 2008, entitled Big Brother: Celebrity Hijack.

This series was the least watched Celebrity Big Brother series, averaging 3.3 million viewers; at the time of transmission, it was also the least watched series of any Big Brother in the UK (excluding spin-offs) until the tenth non-celebrity series pulled in 2.5 million. Despite the low viewership, the launch show was the most watched programme of 2009 on Channel 4, raking in 6 million viewers.

Ulrika and Coolio took part in Ultimate Big Brother in 2010. Coolio was removed within the first few days and Ulrika finished seventh on the final night.

Housemates

Ben Adams
Ben Adams (born 22 November 1981) is an English singer-songwriter, best known for being a member of the British-Norwegian  boyband trio, a1. During his time, he developed a close friendship with fellow housemate, Michelle Heaton. On Day 22, Ben had been evicted from the house with 15.2% of the public vote to win, finishing in fifth place.

Coolio
Coolio (1 August 1963 – 28 September 2022) was an American Grammy Award-winning musician and rapper, who is best known in Britain for his worldwide chart-topping single, Gangsta's Paradise. On Day 22, he became the third evictee on finale night, finishing in a respectable third place. However, in 2010, Coolio returned to Big Brother fame, when he joined Ultimate Big Brother. Coolio passed away on 28 September 2022.

La Toya Jackson
La Toya Jackson (born 29 May 1956) is an American singer-songwriter, musician and television personality, best known for being a member of the musical family, The Jacksons. She maintained     a career as a solo singer throughout the 1980s and 1990s, and has appeared in certain reality shows in America. La Toya became the second Jackson to enter Big Brother, the first being her brother Jermaine in 2007. On Day 20, she was the fourth person to be evicted from the house in a double eviction, along with Tommy Sheridan.

Lucy Pinder
Lucy Pinder (born 20 December 1983) is an English glamour model, from Winchester, Hampshire. She was the first housemate to be evicted from the house on Day 8, with 57% of the public vote and losing to Ulrika Jonsson.

Michelle Heaton
Michelle Heaton (born 19 July 1979) is a pop singer, actress and glamour model, best known for being a former member of the band, Liberty X. During her time in the house, she developed a close friendship with housemate, Ben Adams. On Day 18, Heaton was the third person to be evicted from the Big Brother house, in a surprise eviction.

Mutya Buena
Mutya Buena (born 21 May 1985) is an English recording artist, who rose to fame as one of the original band members of the all-female R&B/pop trio, Sugababes. On Day 15 between 11:30pm-12midnight, Buena decided to walk from the house, just after surviving eviction.

Terry Christian
Terry Christian (born 8 May 1960) is a television and radio presenter, whose credits include Channel 4's late night youth entertainment show, The Word and ITV1's moral issues talk show, It's My Life, but also has been involved with BBC Radio 4. On Day 1, Terry became the first celebrity Head of House. On Day 22, he came second on the final night, losing out to Ulrika Jonsson, with 43.3% to win.

Tina Malone
Tina Malone (born 30 January 1963) is an English actress, best known for her role as Mimi Maguire in the Channel 4 series, Shameless. Despite being on Shameless, she has appeared on shows such as Brookside and dinnerladies. During her time in the house, she has been involved in arguments with Coolio and is known for her loud personality. On Day 15, she became the second person to be evicted from the house with 38.8% of the public vote.

Tommy Sheridan
Tommy Sheridan (born 7 March 1964) is a Scottish socialist politician, known for being in various prominent roles within the socialist movement in Scotland and for being expelled in 1989 as the Labour Party militant tendency entryist. On Day 20, he became the fifth housemate to be evicted from the house in a double eviction, alongside La Toya Jackson.

Ulrika Jonsson
Ulrika Jonsson (born 16 August 1967) is a Swedish-British television presenter, best known for her work as a weather reporter on TV-am, presenter of Gladiators and a panellist on Shooting Stars. In 2002, she had a publicised affair with then-England football manager, Sven-Göran Eriksson. She was the only female housemate in this series to make it to the final, eventually going on to win the show on Day 22, despite being nominated for most evictions.

Verne Troyer
Verne Troyer (1 January 1969 – 21 April 2018) was an American actor and stunt performer, who is best known for playing Mini-Me in the Austin Powers film series. Troyer is most notable for his height 2 ft 8 in (0.81 m), as a result of cartilage–hair hypoplasia dwarfism. On Day 22, he finished the series in fourth place, despite being the bookmakers' favourite from the first day. Verne Troyer died on 21 April 2018.

House
The house used was the one from Big Brother 2008 and was largely unchanged, aside from a few minor modifications. Some of the wall panels near the stairs were modified to include stars in them to go with the format of the series. As the housemates entered the house there was a welcome pack available for housemates to read. The floor pattern in the basic bedroom were changed from the red segment of the BB9 eye, to a sequence of stars, and the beds were larger and more comfortable than in BB9. There was also a sign saying "You don't have to be mad to live here....but it helps" on one of the walls. The bathroom was completely gold, leaving no blue decor. The showers were closed off to give the celebrities privacy, although there were microphones in the showers. The garden house walls are now mainly blue and the pool has been taken out. The jail is now larger and includes a bench and mirror. A new heated sitting area was put in place and there appeared to be no spa or pool replacement. The smoking area, which contained a wall with dolls' faces with no eyes on, was moved for protection against the elements. The living area remained largely unchanged apart from some added weights and gym equipment. A specially designated entrance for housemate Verne was located to the side of the main door. This door does not have stairs.

Daily summary

Nominations table

Notes

Ratings
All ratings are taken from BARB.

References

External links 
 

2009 British television seasons
06